= Radio Lingua Network =

Scottish internet language course provider

- Type: Private
- Founded: October 2006
- Founder: Mark Pentleton
- Headquarters: Ayr, South Ayrshire
- Area served: Worldwide
- Number of employees: 10
- Website: coffeebreaklanguages.com

The Radio Lingua Network is a Scottish company headquartered in South Ayrshire, Scotland that provides various language courses through podcasts and other Internet-based media. Radio Lingua was founded in 2006 by Mark Pentleton, a former teacher of French and Spanish. Its first podcast, Coffee Break Spanish, was released on 18 October 2006. As of February 2017, the company had produced 36 podcasts teaching 27 different languages.

Radio Lingua provides courses about French, Spanish, German, Italian, Arabic, Catalan, Danish, Dutch, Gaelic, Greek, Flemish, Irish, Japanese, Luxembourgish, Mandarin, Norwegian, Polish, Portuguese, Romanian, Russian, Swedish, Turkish, Ukrainian, and Zulu.

Radio Lingua's podcasts have won several national and European awards.

== Podcasts ==
=== French ===
- Coffee Break French
- The Coffee Break French Magazine
- Coffee Break French To Go
- Coffee Break French Travel Diaries
- Coffee Break French Verb Fix
- En Route avec Coffee Break French ("On going with Coffee Break French")
- High Five French
- One Minute French
- On Location French
- Rock Star French
- School Run French
- Twitter Learn French
- La vérité éclate toujours ("The truth always shines")
- Walk, Talk, and Learn French

=== German ===
- A Flavour of German
- One Minute German
- Coffee Break German
- The Coffee Break German Magazine
- Coffee Break German To Go
- Coffee Break German Travel Diaries
- My Daily Phrase German

=== Italian ===
- Coffee Break Italian
- The Coffee Break Italian Magazine
- Coffee Break Italian To Go
- Coffee Break Italian Travel Diaries
- My Daily Phrase Italian
- One Minute Italian
- Twitter Learn Italian
- Walk, Talk, and Learn Italian

=== Spanish ===
- Coffee Break Spanish
- Coffee Break Spanish Espresso
- The Coffee Break Spanish Magazine
- Coffee Break Spanish To Go
- Coffee Break Spanish Travel Diaries
- En Marcha con Coffee Break Spanish ("On going with Coffee Break Spanish")
- High Five Spanish
- News Time Spanish
- One Minute Spanish
- One Minute Spanish for Latin America
- Show Time Spanish
- Twitter Learn Spanish

=== Swedish ===
- Coffee Break Swedish
- One Minute Swedish

=== Chinese ===
- Coffee Break Chinese

=== English ===
- Coffee Break English

=== Other Languages ===
- One Minute Arabic
- One Minute Catalan
- One Minute Czech
- One Minute Danish
- One Minute Dutch
- One Minute Finnish
- One Minute Flemish
- One Minute Gaelic
- One Minute Galician
- One Minute Greek
- One Minute Hungarian
- One Minute Icelandic
- One Minute Irish
- One Minute Japanese
- One Minute Latvian
- One Minute Luxembourgish
- One Minute Mandarin
- One Minute Norwegian
- One Minute Polish
- One Minute Portuguese
- One Minute Romanian
- One Minute Russian
- One Minute Slovak
- One Minute Turkish
- One Minute Ukrainian
- One Minute Zulu
